Adrian Blincoe (born 4 November 1979 in Auckland) is a New Zealand middle-distance runner. In July 2008 he set the New Zealand record in the 5000m, running 13:10.19.

Blincoe represented New Zealand in the 2008 Summer Olympics at Beijing in the 5000 metres, coming 27th. In 2012 he was in the New Zealand team for the 2012 Summer Olympics at London, but withdrew because of an ankle injury when he was about to compete in the 5000 metres.

He also represented New Zealand at the 2006 Commonwealth Games (1500 metres) and at the 2010 Commonwealth Games (1500 metres and 5000 metres).

Blincoe attended university in the United States at Villanova University, where he was coached by three-time world champion Marcus O'Sullivan.  He was a 7-time All-American at Villanova in cross country, indoor and outdoor track.  He holds the Villanova school record in the 3000 metres, and was both an NCAA champion and runner-up at that distance. He also won two NCAA DMR titles while at Villanova.  Blincoe was both a professional runner and an assistant coach at Villanova from 2004 through 2012. In 2012 he joined High Performance Sport New Zealand. Blincoe married fellow Villanova alumna Kelly Coyle in New Zealand on 12 December 2008.

Achievements

Personal bests

References

External links
 
 
 
 
 

1979 births
Living people
New Zealand male middle-distance runners
Athletes (track and field) at the 2008 Summer Olympics
Olympic athletes of New Zealand
Commonwealth Games competitors for New Zealand
Athletes (track and field) at the 2006 Commonwealth Games
Athletes (track and field) at the 2010 Commonwealth Games
Athletes from Auckland
New Zealand male cross country runners